This is a list of '''townships and districts of Myanmar by total fertility rate in 2014.

List

See also
Demographics of Myanmar

References

The 2014 Myanmar Population and Housing Census. 2016. Thematic report on fertility and nuptiality. Census Report Volume 4-A. Department of Population Ministry of Labour, Immigration and Population, Myanmar.

Fertility
Demographics of Myanmar